The 1990 Chadian coup d'état took place on 3 December 1990 when the forces of the Patriotic Salvation Movement (MPS), a Libyan–backed rebel group under the leadership of General Idriss Déby, entered the Chadian capital N'Djamena unopposed. The MPS troops entered Chad by crossing the Sudanese border three weeks earlier.

Previously, on 2 December, authoritarian, Western backed President Hissène Habré (who ruled the country since 1982) reportedly fled to neighboring Cameroon with his family, Cabinet and top aides as his military, the Chadian National Armed Forces (FANT), collapsed.

French position
Although France repeatedly supported the Habré government against local rebellions and Libyan attacks in the 1980s, the French government gave instructions to the 1,300 French troops stationed in Chad not to intervene in what it described as an internal conflict, with French Foreign Minister Roland Dumas saying in an apparent reference to France's traditional deep involvement in Françafrique, its former colonies in Africa:

Dumas said some 300 extra French troops were sent to Chad in recent days only to protect French citizens and maintain order. The French and the MPS troops immediately began disarming civilians and restoring order after rioting and looting swept through N'Djamena after the collapse of the Habré government.

See also

History of Chad

References

Coup
Chad
Military coups in Chad
Political history of Chad
December 1990 events in Africa
1990s coups d'état and coup attempts
Battles involving Libya
Battles involving Sudan
Chadian–Libyan War